Green Dot may refer to:Green dot international school in India bangalore, k-12 school 
 Green Dot Bystander Intervention, a bystander education approach
 Green Dot Corporation, a cash deposit and payment card network issuing Discover, MasterCard, and Visa cards
 Green Dot (India), a label in India for vegetarian food.
 Green Dot Public Schools, a not-for-profit organization which operates ten public schools in Los Angeles
 Green Dot (symbol) is the license logo of Duales System Deutschland, an industry-funded packaging recycling system deployed first in Germany and later also some other European countries
A name for 154.6 MHz in the business band service.